Mount Hood is the tallest mountain in the U.S. state of Oregon.

Mount Hood may also refer to:

Mount Hood (Alberta), a mountain in Alberta, Canada
Mount Hood, Oregon, a community in Oregon 
Mount Hood (California), a mountain in northern California
Mount Hood (painting), an 1869 painting by Albert Bierstadt
USS Mount Hood, multiple ships including:
, an ammunition ship in service during World War II in the Pacific Ocean
, an ammunition ship in service from 1971 to 1999

See also